The Williamson House is a historic house at 325 Fairfax Street in Little Rock, Arkansas, USA. It is a two-story wood-frame structure, with a gabled roof, clapboarded exterior, and brick foundation. Its roof has exposed rafter ends in the Craftsman style, and a wraparound porch supported by simple square columns.  The projecting entry porch has a gable with decorative false half-timbering, and is supported by grouped columns. The house was designed by Little Rock architect Theodore Sanders and was built about 1911. Photos of the house were used in promotional materials for the subdivision in which it is located.

The house was listed on the National Register of Historic Places in 1984.

See also
National Register of Historic Places listings in Little Rock, Arkansas

References

Houses on the National Register of Historic Places in Arkansas
Houses completed in 1911
Houses in Little Rock, Arkansas
National Register of Historic Places in Little Rock, Arkansas
Historic district contributing properties in Arkansas